Crepidiastrum sonchifolium, the sonchus-leaf crepidiastrum, is a flowering plant in the family Asteraceae. It is native to East Asia (China, Korea, Mongolia), and is cultivated in Korea. It grows in a variety of habitats including grasslands on mountain slopes, thickets, rocky stream beds, cliffs, and roadsides.

References 

Flora of China
Flora of Mongolia
sonchifolium
Flora of Korea
Korean vegetables